The Fourth Minnesota International Piano-e-Competition took place in Minneapolis–Saint Paul from June 29 to July 10, 2009.

Jury
 Alexander Braginsky (nonvoting chairman)
 David Dubal
 Akiko Ebi
 Gabriel Kwok
 Nikolai Petrov
 Jerome Rose
 Jeremy Siepmann
 Arie Vardi

Awards

Competition results, by rounds

Preliminary round
February 12–15, Yamaha Artist Services Inc. (Piano Salon), New York City.

1st round
June 30-July 4, Orchestra Hall, Minneapolis.
 China Chao-yin Cai
 Russia Elmar Gasanov
 Russia Vyacheslav Gryaznov
 China Ran Jia
 Ukraine Germany Andrej Jussow
 South Korea Grace Eunhae Kim
 Russia Eduard Kunz
 Taiwan Hanchien Lee
 USA Howard Na
 Poland Piotr Rozanski
 Japan Yukiko Sekino
 Canada Alexander Seredenko
 China Rui Shi
 USA Andrew Staupe
 Russia Konstantin Soukhovetski
 South Korea Young-Ah Tak
 Italy Alessandro Taverna
 Russia Anastasya Terenkova
 France Hélène Tysman
 China Clara Hui Yang
 Belarus Pavel Yeletskiy
 China Dizhou Zhao
 Ukraine Denis Zhdanov
 USA Eric Zuber

References

External links
 Alink-Argerich Foundation

Minnesota
June 2009 events in the United States
July 2009 events in the United States
2009 in American music
2009 in Minnesota